Night of the Aurochs is an unfinished novel by Dalton Trumbo (died 1976), published posthumously in 1979.

Plot introduction
Aurochs is an attempt by Trumbo to tell the tale of World War II through the eyes of a Nazi by the name of Grieban, commandant of the concentration camp at Auschwitz.

The book is compiled and edited by Robert Kirsch. The story starts out narrated in the first person through a series of letters written by Grieban, but later is written in the third person.

Plot summary

In his narration, Grieban tries to link the ethical nature of the Nazi movement to the American Civil War by saying the comparisons are undeniable: Fighting to keep the races pure and separated. Grieban may be looked at as the epitome of one fighting for the cause, but he himself fails to live up to his own high ideals of racial purity when he falls in 'love' with a Jewish woman during his years as a Nazi concentration camp commandant.

Major themes
In the latter parts of the book one can see sympathy for Grieban, and Greiban is depicted as a broken man, living out the rest of his years in hiding, and dying with no one around who particularly cares about him.

For authenticity, Trumbo, as was in the case of  Johnny Got His Gun, tried to become the character that he was writing about.

1979 American novels
Novels set during World War II
Unfinished books
Viking Press books